Pol-e Bala Rud (also Romanized as Pol-e Bālā Rūd; also known as Bālārūd and Bālā Rūd) is a village in Hoseyniyeh Rural District, Alvar-e Garmsiri District, Andimeshk County, Khuzestan Province, Iran. At the 2006 census, its population was 331, in 65 families.

References 

Populated places in Andimeshk County